The 15719 / 20 Katihar - Siliguri Junction Intercity Express is a Express train belonging to Indian Railways Northeast Frontier Railway that runs between  of Bihar  and  of West Bengal in India.

Coaches
The 15719 / 20 Katihar - Siliguri Junction Intercity Express has ten general unreserved & two SLR (seating with luggage rake) coaches.

Service

Routing

Traction
As the route is going to electrification, a Diesel Loco Shed, Siliguri based WDP4 / WDP4B / WDP4D diesel locomotive pulls the train to its destination.

Incidents
On 10th May 2017, at 4:30 am Siliguri Katihar Intercity Express travelling from  towards  hits and kills an elephant between Bagdogra and Naksalbari in Darjeeling district of West Bengal.

References

External links
15719 Intercity Express at India Rail Info
15720 Intercity Express at India Rail Info

Intercity Express (Indian Railways) trains
Transport in Katihar
Rail transport in Bihar
Rail transport in West Bengal
Transport in Siliguri